is a passenger railway station located in the city of Mitoyo, Kagawa Prefecture, Japan.  It is operated by JR Shikoku and has the station number "Y14".

Lines
Takuma Station is served by the JR Shikoku Yosan Line and is located 42.0 km from the beginning of the line at Takamatsu. Yosan line local, Rapid Sunport, and Nanpū Relay services stop at the station. In addition, there are two trains a day running a local service on the Seto-Ōhashi Line which stop at the station.

The following JR Shikoku limited express services also stop at the station:

Layout
The station consists of an island platform serving two tracks. A station building houses a waiting room, kiosk and a JR ticket window (with a Midori no Madoguchi facility). Access to the island platform is by means of a level crossing. Parking is available outside the station. A siding branches off on the side of platform/track 1 and there is a passing loop beyond platform/track 2.

Adjacent stations

History
At that time the station was operated by Japanese Government Railways, later becoming Japanese National Railways (JNR). With the privatization of JNR on 1 April 1987, control of the station passed to JR Shikoku.

Surrounding area
Takuma Port
Mitoyo Municipal Matsuzaki Elementary School

See also
 List of railway stations in Japan

References

External links

 Station official home page

External links
Takuma Station (JR Shikoku)

Railway stations in Kagawa Prefecture
Railway stations in Japan opened in 1913
Mitoyo, Kagawa